Fullerton station may refer to:

Fullerton Transportation Center, Fullerton, California
Fullerton station (CTA), Chicago